Dziekanowice may refer to the following places:
Dziekanowice, Kraków County in Lesser Poland Voivodeship (south Poland)
Dziekanowice, part of the Mistrzejowice district of Kraków
Dziekanowice, Myślenice County in Lesser Poland Voivodeship (south Poland)
Dziekanowice, Świętokrzyskie Voivodeship (south-central Poland)
Dziekanowice, Greater Poland Voivodeship (west-central Poland)